Sherburne Historic District is a national historic district located at Sherburne in Chenango County, New York. The district includes 119 contributing buildings and one contributing structure.  The district contains four areas: the commercial district, the South Main Street neighborhood, the William Champ Park and environs, and the East State Street residential area.  The district includes commercial, academic, industrial, and residential properties.  Among the notable structures are the Sherburne Bank Building (now Post Office, 1880), Sanford Block (now Masonic Temple, 1882), Sherburne Inn (1917), Congregational Church (1864–1868, 1884), and Sherburne Public Library (1910, 1938).

It was added to the National Register of Historic Places in 1982.

References

Historic districts on the National Register of Historic Places in New York (state)
Historic districts in Chenango County, New York
National Register of Historic Places in Chenango County, New York